The Supernatural Role Playing Game is a role-playing game by Margaret Weis Productions that was released in 2009. It is based on the television series Supernatural and was the final game to use the Cortex System.

The Game

Like most role-playing games, Supernatural requires several players; one person to be the Game Master and two to five others to play hunters such as Dean Winchester and Sam Winchester.  It also requires multiple polyhedral dice ranging from four-sided to twelve-sided.

The setting

The Supernatural Role Playing Game is set in the world of the Supernatural TV series and focuses on an elite group of hunters who deal with supernatural threats ordinary people do not believe exist.  The very first chapter of the book sets the scene and is called Be Afraid of the Dark.  It was produced in 2009, before the fifth season had aired and so doesn't contain any information relevant to the series after this date, but uses information from the show, the graphic novels, and the novels.

The Rules

Supernatural was the final role-playing game published using the Cortex System, and the final one by Jamie Chambers; all subsequent games from Margaret Weis Productions have been produced under the Cortex Plus system.  The system itself uses dice of various sizes ranging from 2 sided (a coin) to 12 sided for attributes, skills, Assets (positive character traits), and Complications (negative character traits).  When trying a challenging task, roll the dice for the relevant attribute, skill, and any relevant assets and complications, and compare against a target number decided by the GM.  Character creation is point buy by category, with a separate pool for skills and stats, and the size of the pool depending on how powerful the characters are intended to be.

History 
The rights to the license were acquired in the spring of 2007 by Margaret Weis Productions, Ltd (MWP). It was also around this time that New York Times best-selling author Margaret Weis announced that the license to Dragonlance was not renewed so that the company could focus on the Supernatural RPG as well as their work on the Battlestar Galactica RPG. The Supernatural Role Playing Game was one of the three new Cortex media games published by Margaret Weis Productions, one each year between 2007-2009, after the Battlestar Galactica Role Playing Game (2007) and the Demon Hunters Role Playing Game (2008). It was finally released in August 2009.

Early indications by Jamie Chambers place the first official game event to be at Gen Con 2007 in Indianapolis, Indiana. This will include "two adventures that will allow players to experience the Supernatural Role Playing Game for the first time outside of our internal playtesting and development."

The reception was lukewarm, with Flames Rising declaring "If you are already a fan of the Supernatural TV show and want to play out the kind of adventures that happen to its protagonists, this book will come as a real treat. If you don’t know the show or are just looking for a game in which present-day heroes deal with supernatural menaces, this probably is not the game for you." Douglas Schules, writing for Transformative Works and Cultures concluded: "[The] Supernatural Role Playing Game doesn't contribute anything too novel to the genre of RPGs. ... Even the incorporation of the television show's characters, monsters, and plots into the text as potential a campaign suggestions parallels industry practice, but this does not diminish the potential of players and game masters to appropriate the show and make it their own."

References 

Horror role-playing games
Margaret Weis Productions games
Role-playing games based on television series
Role-playing games introduced in 2009